The Evergreen Conference (EvCo), known as the Tri-Normal League from 1920 to 1938 and the Washington Intercollegiate Conference (WINCO) from 1938 to 1947, was an intercollegiate athletic conference composed of member schools located in the states of Idaho, Oregon, and Washington and, for a time, the Canadian province of British Columbia. The league existed from 1938 to 1984. Most of the conference's members subsequently joined the Columbia Football Association.

Members
The following is an incomplete list of the membership of the Evergreen Conference.

Membership timeline

Football champions

Tri-Normal League (1920–1937)

1920 – Spokane
1921 – Normal–Cheney
1922 – Unknown
1923 – Normal–Cheney and Normal–Bellingham
1924 – Normal–Bellingham
1925 – Normal–Cheney
1926 – Normal–Ellensburg
1927 – Normal–Ellensburg
1928 – Normal–Ellensburg

1929 – Normal–Ellensburg
1930 – Unknown
1931 – Unknown
1932 – Unknown
1933 – Normal–Ellensburg
1934 – Normal–Cheney
1935 – Normal–Cheney
1936 – Normal–Cheney
1937 – Normal–Cheney

Washington Intercollegiate Conference (1938–1947)

1938 – Western Washington
1939 – Eastern Washington & Pacific Lutheran
1940 – Pacific Lutheran

1941 – Pacific Lutheran

1942 – Central Washington
1943 – No champion
1944 – No champion

1945 – No champion
1946 – Central Washington
1947 – Eastern Washington & Pacific Lutheran

Evergreen Conference (1948–1984)

1948 – Eastern Washington and Puget Sound
1949 – Eastern Washington and Puget Sound
1950 – Eastern Washington
1951 – Pacific Lutheran, Puget Sound, and Western Washington
1952 – Pacific Lutheran
1953 – Puget Sound and Whitworth
1954 – Whitworth
1955 – Whitworth
1956 – Puget Sound
1957 – Central Washington
1958 – Central Washington and Western Washington
1959 – Whitworth
1960 – Whitworth

1961 – Central Washington
1962 – Whitworth
1963 – Central Washington
1964 – Pacific Lutheran
1965 – Eastern Washington
1966 – Eastern Washington
1967 – Eastern Washington
1968 – Central Washington
1969 – Eastern Washington and Western Washington
1970 – Central Washington
1971 – Western Washington
1972 – Central Washington

1973 – Central Washington
1974 – Oregon Tech
1975 – Western Oregon
1976 – Western Oregon
1977 – Western Oregon
1978 – Western Oregon
1979 – Western Oregon
1980 – Eastern Oregon, Oregon Tech, and Western Oregon
1981 – Oregon Tech
1982 – Central Washington and Oregon Tech
1983 – Puget Sound
1984 – Central Washington

See also
 List of defunct college football conferences
 Oregon Collegiate Conference
 Columbia Football League
 Columbia Football Association
 Great Northwest Athletic Conference

References

 
College sports in Oregon
College sports in Washington (state)
Sports leagues established in 1920